Oxalis exilis, the least yellow sorrel or shady woodsorrel, is a small herbaceous plant found in Australia and New Zealand. It is mainly found in hillsides and weedy areas. It is the smallest species of Oxalis in New Zealand. The colors of the leaves range from green to purple. The capsule and style length vary from 4–6.5 mm.

References

exilis
Plants described in 1839
Flora of Australia
Flora of New Zealand